Julie Taylor may refer to:

Julie Taylor (rugby union) (born 1970), rugby player
Julie Taylor, a character from the TV show Friday Night Lights
Julie Ann Taylor (born 1966), American voice actress